Cydnor Bailey Tompkins (November 8, 1810 – July 23, 1862) was an American lawyer and politician who served two terms as a U.S. Representative from Ohio from 1857 to 1861. He was the father of Emmett Tompkins.

Biography 
Born near St. Clairsville in Belmont County, Ohio, Tompkins moved with his parents to Morgan County in 1831 and settled near McConnelsville.
He completed preparatory studies, and was graduated from the Ohio University at Athens in 1835.
He studied law.
He was admitted to the bar in 1837 and commenced practice in McConnelsville, Morgan County, Ohio.
He served as recorder of McConnelsville in 1840.
He served as prosecuting attorney of Morgan County 1848–1851.
Street commissioner of McConnelsville in 1850.
He served as member of the Republican State convention in 1855.

Congress 
Tompkins was elected as a Republican to the Thirty-fifth and Thirty-sixth Congresses (March 4, 1857 – March 3, 1861).
He served as chairman of the Committee on Militia (Thirty-sixth Congress).
He was an unsuccessful candidate for renomination in 1860.

Later career and death 
He resumed the practice of law.
He died in McConnelsville, Ohio, July 23, 1862.
He was interred in McConnelsville Cemetery.

Sources

External links
 
 

1810 births
1862 deaths
People from McConnelsville, Ohio
People from St. Clairsville, Ohio
Ohio University alumni
County district attorneys in Ohio
19th-century American politicians
Republican Party members of the United States House of Representatives from Ohio